The Thathanabaing of Burma (also spelt Thathanapaing) served as the head of the Buddhist Sangha (order of monks) in pre-colonial Burma, until the position was abolished in 1938 by the British authorities in colonial Burma. The Thathanapaing was responsible for managing the monastic hierarchy and education at monasteries. The Thathanabaing resided in a royal monastery near the kingdom's capital. However, appointees were usually commoners born in the villages, with no blood relationship with the royal house. Their appointments were made on the basis of their mastery of Buddhist knowledge and literature.

Etymology
Thathanabaing, literally 'Keeper of the Sāsana', is the native Burmese rendition of Sangharaja, or formally Mahasangharaja, which is typically rendered into English as 'Primate', 'Archbishop' or 'Supreme Patriarch.' The term "Sangharaja" was popularly used from the 1300s to 1400s, but lost currency in subsequent centuries. By the Konbaung dynasty, Thathanabaing and Thathanapyu (သာသနာပြု) were frequently used.

History
According to Burmese chronicles, the office of the Thathanabaing dates to the reign of Swa Saw Ke (1367-1400). British historians recognize a lineage of primates during the Pagan Kingdom, beginning with the monk Shin Arahan.

Konbaung dynasty

The office, in its last incarnation, was established by King Bodawpaya in 1784, after the constitution of the Sudhamma Council, a council of four elder monks (thera), of which the Thathanabaing was its head. Subsequent monarchs expanded the council, which varied from 8 to 12 members called sadaw. Council members were appointed by the king and styled Dazeitya Sayadaw ('Teachers Possessing the Seal').

The Thathanabaing was appointed by the king and granted supreme authority with regard to religious doctrine and ecclesiastical administration. The Thathanapaing was responsible for the kingdom's religious affairs, including appointment of monastery abbots, monk orders according to the Vinaya, management of breaches of discipline, preparation of an annual report of the order, and administration of Pali examinations.

The Thathanabaing was charged with managing the functions of two government officials, the Mahadan Wun (Ecclesiastical Censor), who oversaw the king's charitable functions, ensured monk compliance with the Vinaya, and submitted registers of all active novices and monks, and the Wutmye Wun, who managed the wuttukan-designated religious properties, including donated land and pagodas.  The Burmese kingdom was divided into ecclesiastical jurisdictions, each of which was overseen by a gaing-gyok. Underneath each gaing-gyok was a number of gaing-ok, who were in turn assisted by a number of gaing-dauk. Ecclesiastical disputes were settled by the gaing-gyok and decisions for appeal were made by the Sudhamma Council.

Colonial rule

In 1895, soon after the abdication of the country's last king, Thibaw Min, the Taungdaw Sayadaw, then the Thathanapaing of Burma, died. A subsequent election elected the Pakhan Sayadaw as Thathanabaing-elect, although the British refused to acknowledge or recognize his title.

In 1903, the lieutenant-governor of British Burma, Hugh Shakespear Barnes, reinstated the title by sanad charter, giving the Thathanapaing nominal authority over internal administration of the Sangha in Upper Burma and over Buddhist ecclesiastical law. (Lower Burma, which had been annexed in 1852, remained without a religious head.) The Taunggwin Sayadaw was appointed, but the position was abolished after his death and no successor was ever appointed.

Independence
On May 24, 1980, the State Saṅgha Mahā Nāyaka Committee was formed as an official agency of the Myanma government, tasked with essentially the same roles and responsibilities as those of the thathanabaing.

List of Thathanabaing

Kingdom of Ava 
 Yakhaing Sayadaw
 Amyint Sayadaw

Konbaung dynasty 
 Atula Sayadaw
 Taungdwingyi Sayadaw
 Sayit Sayadaw
 Ashin Thapon
 Hteintabin Sayadaw
 Manle Sayadaw
 Min-o Sayadaw
 Zonta Sayadaw
 Minywa Sayadaw
 Maungdaung Sayadaw
 Salin Sayadaw
 The-in Sayadaw
 Maungdaung Sayadaw
 Bagaya Sayadaw
 Maungdaung Sayadaw
 Taungdaw Sayadaw

British rule 
 Moeta Sayadaw
 Taunggwin Sayadaw

Notes

References

See also
 Agga Maha Pandita
 Buddhism in Myanmar
 Mahanayaka
 Sangharaja
 Sangha Supreme Council, Thailand
 State Saṅgha Mahā Nāyaka Committee
 Supreme Patriarch of Cambodia
 Supreme Patriarch of Thailand
 Burmese Buddhist titles

 
Burmese Buddhist titles